Bucculatrix ratisbonensis is a moth of the family Bucculatricidae. It is found from Fennoscandia to Italy and from Germany to Russia. It was described in 1861 by Henry Tibbats Stainton (as Bucculatrix artemisiae var. ratisbonensis).

The wingspan is 7–8 mm. There are two to three generations per year with adults on wing from May to August.

The larvae feed on Artemisia campestris and Artemisia vulgaris. They mine the leaves of their host plant.

References

Moths described in 1861
Bucculatricidae
Moths of Europe
Taxa named by Henry Tibbats Stainton